Relaxin' With Chet (1969) is a compilation by Chet Atkins.

Track listing

Side 1:
 "Blues for Dr. Joe"
 "Sophisticated Lady"
 "Yesterdays"
 "Say Si Si"
 "Vilia"

Side 2:
 "Martha"
 "In the Chapel in the Moonlight"
 "Czardas"
 "Nagasaki"
 "April in Portugal"

Personnel
Chet Atkins – guitar

References

External links
 Chet Atkins Official Website discography

1969 albums
Chet Atkins albums
RCA Camden albums